Ernst Orvil (née Ernst Richard Nilsen; 12 April 1898 – 16 June 1985) was a Norwegian novelist, short story writer, poet and playwright.

Biography
Ernst Richard Orvil  was born in Kristiania (now Oslo), Norway. His parents Johan Nilsen (Rev. Nilsson) (1859-1957) and Sara-Lisa Pettersson (1864-1940), were  both from Värmland, Sweden. He graduated artium at the Kristiania cathedral school in 1917.  Later he was an engineering student  at the Norwegian Institute of Technology in Trondheim.

He made his literary debut with the novel Birger in 1932, followed by six annual releases in this same genre. His first poetry collection was Bølgeslag (1940). His more notable works include Menneskebråk (1936), Hvit ur (1937)   and Synøve selv  (1946).

Orvil was awarded Gyldendal's Endowment in 1946. He received the Aschehoug Prize in 1979. He was awarded the Riksmål Society Literature Prize in 1984.

References

1898 births
1985 deaths
Writers from Oslo
People educated at Oslo Cathedral School
Norwegian Institute of Technology alumni
Norwegian male poets
Norwegian male novelists
Norwegian male dramatists and playwrights
20th-century Norwegian dramatists and playwrights
20th-century Norwegian male writers
20th-century Norwegian novelists
20th-century Norwegian poets